The Renault 5 is a five-passenger, three or five-door, front-engine, front-wheel drive hatchback supermini manufactured and marketed by the French automaker Renault over two generations: 1972–1985 (also called R5) and 1984–1996 (also called Super 5 or Supercinq). The R5 was marketed in the US and Canada as Le Car, from 1976 until 1983. Renault marketed a four-door sedan variant, the Renault 7, manufactured from 1974 until 1984 in Spain by Renault's subsidiary FASA-Renault and exported to select markets.

The Renault 5 became the best-selling car in France from 1972 until 1986, with a total production exceeding 5.5 million over a 14-year period, making it France's most popular car.

First generation (1972–1985)

The first images and details of the Renault 5 were published on 10 December 1971, and the car's formal launch followed on 28 January 1972.

The Renault 5 was styled by Michel Boué, who designed the car in his spare time, outside of his normal duties. When Renault executives learned of Boué's work, they were so impressed by his concept they immediately authorized a formal development program. The R5 featured a steeply sloping rear hatchback. Boué had wanted the tail-lights to go all the way up from the bumper into the C-pillar, in the fashion of the much later Fiat Punto and Volvo 850 estate/wagon, but the lights remained at a more conventional level.

It was launched onto the right-hand drive UK market in the autumn of 1972, where alongside the recently launched Fiat 127 it competed as an imported but more modern alternative to British Leyland's Mini and Chrysler Europe's Hillman Imp — and without competitors from Ford or Vauxhall.

The 5 narrowly missed out on the 1973 European Car of the Year award, which was instead given to the Audi 80.

Boué died of cancer at the end of 1972, just a few months after the car he designed was launched.

The R5 borrowed mechanicals from the successful Renault 4, using a longitudinally-mounted engine driving the front wheels with torsion bar suspension. OHV engines were the same as the Renault 4 and larger Renault 8. At the car's launch, the 782 cc and 956 cc versions were available depending on the model level. A "5TS/5LS" with the 1,289 cc engine from the Renault 12 was added from April 1974. As on the Renault 4, entry-level Renault 5s had their engine sizes increased to 845 cc in 1976, and at the top of the range later models included the 1,397 cc version.

It was one of the first modern superminis, which capitalized on the new hatchback design, which Renault had patented on its R16, launched in 1965. It was launched a year after the booted version of the Fiat 127, and during the same year that the 127 became available with a hatchback. The R5 was launched three years before the Volkswagen Polo and Vauxhall Chevette, and four years before the Ford Fiesta - new superminis which met the growing demand for this type of car in Western Europe. British Leyland was working on a new modern supermini during the 1970s, but the end product - the Austin Metro - was not launched until 1980. It was also introduced one year before the Toyota Starlet, while the Datsun 100A arrived in the UK starting in 1971. It was introduced six months before the Honda Civic which appeared later in July.

Sales in Japan began in 1976, where both the 2-door and 4-door were available at Capital Car Dealerships. It was called the "Renault Go" because that is the Japanese word for "five". While originally sold with North American spec emissions equipment, it was changed to a French emissions package. The car was initially sold as left-hand drive, then upgraded to right-hand drive.

Although the mechanical components came from earlier models, body construction involved floor sections welded together with the other body panels, resulting in a monocoque structure. The approach had by then become mainstream among many European automakers, but represented an advance on the mechanically similar Renault 4 and Renault 6 both of which used a separate platform. The monocoque structure reduced the car's weight, but required investment in new production processes.

The Renault 5 was targeted at cost-conscious customers, and the entry-level "L" version came with the same 782 cc power plant as the cheaper Renault 4 and drum brakes on all four wheels. In 1972, it was priced in France at below 10,000 francs. However, for many export markets the entry-level version was excluded from the range and front-wheel disc brakes were offered on the more powerful 956 cc "Renault 5TL" along with such attractions under the bonnet/hood as an alternator, and in the cabin reclining backrests for the front seats. From outside the "TL" was differentiated from the "L" by a thin chrome strip below the doors.

The early production R5 used a dashboard-mounted gearshift, linked by a rod that ran over the top of the engine to a single bend where the rod turned downwards and linked into the gearbox, which was positioned directly in front of the engine. A floor-mounted lever employing a cable linkage replaced this arrangement in 1973. An automatic version, with the larger 1,289 cc engine, was added in early 1978. At the time, the automatic usually represented just under five percent of overall Renault 5 production. Door handles were formed by a cut-out in the door panel and B-pillar. The R5 was one of the first cars produced with plastic (polyester and fiberglass) bumpers, which came from a specialist Renault factory at Dreux. These covered a larger area of potential contact than conventional car bumpers of the time and survived low-speed parking shunts without permanently distorting. This helped the car gain a reputation as an "outstanding city car", and bumpers of this type subsequently became an industry standard.

The R5's engine was set well back in the engine bay, behind the gearbox. The passenger compartment "is remarkably spacious" in comparison to other modern, small European cars. The Renault 5 body's drag coefficient was only 0.37 (with most European cars going up to 0.45).

Other versions of the first generation included the four-door saloon version called the Renault 7 and built by FASA-Renault of Spain, where virtually all examples were sold. A five-door R5 was added to the range in 1979, making it one of the first cars of its size to feature four passenger doors. The three-speed Automatic, which received equipment similar to the R5 GTL, but with a 1,289 cc (55 bhp) engine, a vinyl roof, and the TS' front seats, also became available with five-door bodywork. In March 1981, the automatic received the 1.4 L engine that increased both performance and fuel economy.

Renault 5 Alpine/Gordini/Copa

The Renault 5 Alpine was one of the first hot-hatches, launched in 1976 - going on sale two months before the original Volkswagen Golf GTI and two years after the Simca 1100Ti. The right-hand drive version was shown at the British Motor Show in 1978 and was officially on sale from 4 April 1979 in the UK and was sold as the Renault 5 Gordini because Chrysler Europe already had the rights to the name "Alpine" in the UK and it had just been introduced on the Chrysler Alpine (UK version of Simca 1307) at the time. This was still months before the right-hand drive VW Golf GTi which also took three years to be converted by the factory to RHD. Use of the name Gordini was from Amédée Gordini, who was a French tuner with strong links with Renault and previous sporting models such as the Renault 8. This (and the later Alpine Turbo models) were assembled at Alpine's Dieppe plant, beginning in 1975. UK launch price was £4149, nearly a third more than the previous top model the TS at £3187, showing the considerable changes to the car over the 64PS TS which could not reach  compared to the 93PS Gordini which could reach .

The 1.4 L (1397 cc) OHV engine, mated to a five-speed gearbox, was based on the Renault "Sierra" pushrod engine, but having a crossflow cylinder head with hemispherical combustion chambers and developed , twice as much as a standard 1.1 L (1108 cc) Renault 5. The larger engine and its various performance parts meant that the spare wheel could no longer fit there and was relocated to the boot/trunk. The Alpine could be identified by special alloy wheels and front fog lights and was equipped with stiffened suspension, but still retaining the torsion bar at the rear with added anti-roll bars.

Renault 5 Alpine Turbo/Gordini Turbo/Copa Turbo
The Renault 5 Alpine Turbo was launched in 1982 as an upgraded successor to the naturally aspirated Alpine. In Britain, the car was still called Gordini rather than Alpine. Motor magazine undertook a road test of the Turbo in 1982 and while they appreciated the performance (top speed ,  in 8.7 seconds), they were critical of its high price as it was £2 more than the larger Ford Escort XR3.

Sales continued until 1984 when the second generation Renault 5 was launched, and the release of the Renault 5 GT Turbo in 1985.

Renault 5 Turbo

The Renault 5 Turbo should not be confused with the Alpine Turbo or GT Turbo as it was radically modified by mounting a turbocharged engine behind the driver in what is normally the passenger compartment, creating a mid-engined rally car. It was also driven by the rear wheels rather than the front wheels. The Renault 5 Turbo was made in many guises, eventually culminating with the Renault 5 Maxi Turbo. With 8-valves, the 1.4-liter turbocharged inline-four Cléon-Fonte engine produced 160 PS (158 hp; 118 kW) at 6000 rpm and maximum torque of 221 N⋅m (163 lb⋅ft) at 3250 rpm.

Renault Le Car 

Renault had about 250 dealerships in the United States. The North American Renault 5 debuted in 1976, but sales were disappointing and many cars remained on dealer lots. Renault's response was to change advertising agencies and rebrand the car for the following year as "Le Car". The new marketing campaign stressed the car's sporty character and successful European competition history.

Renault formed an alliance in January 1979 allowing Renault cars to be sold and serviced by American Motors Corporation (AMC) dealers. The automaker marketed it through its 1,300 dealers, where it competed in the United States against such front-wheel-drive subcompacts as the Honda Civic, and Volkswagen Rabbit. It was described as a "French Rabbit" that "is low on style, but high on personality and practicality".

American Motors' ad agency launched the car in the U.S. with a marketing campaign emphasizing that it was Europe's best-selling automobile with millions of satisfied owners. It did not achieve such immediate success in the United States market, even though the Le Car was praised in road tests comparing "super-economy" cars for its interior room and smooth ride, with an economical [ highway and  city] as well as its smooth-running engine. Advertisements also focused on the Le Car's standard features and low base price, actually comparing it to the imported Ford Fiesta, Honda Civic, and VW Rabbit.

In 1977, it dominated the Sports Car Club of America "Showroom Stock Class C" class.

The Le Car was offered in three-door hatchback form only from 1976 until 1980. For the 1980 model year, the front end was updated to include a redesigned bumper and grille, as well as rectangular headlights. A five-door hatchback body style was added in the 1981 model year. Sales increased each year, from 6,800 in 1976 to 37,000 in 1982. Although the Le Car did not see popularity in the U.S., it sold reasonably well in Canada. Imports from France continued through 1983, when the car was replaced by the Kenosha, Wisconsin—built Renault 11-based Renault Alliance. Sales in Canada continued until 1985, when production of the first generation Renault 5 came to an end.

In at least two U.S. municipalities, the Le Car was used as a law enforcement vehicle, when the La Conner, Washington, police department acquired three of the vehicles for its fleet in the late-1970s. Renault advertised Le Car's versatility in a full-page ad featuring its use by the department. The Ogunquit, Maine, police department also used Renault 5's as their police cars in the late 70s/early 80s.

Heuliez built and sold van conversions as Le Car Van. The rear side panels were replaced with plastic panels that included round porthole windows and a new small windowed liftgate. The interior was red velour. It was available both in two- and four-seat versions. Between 1979 and 1983, about 450 Le Car Vans were built.

In 1978, the converted cars were rebranded "Lectric Leopard" and marketed to government agencies.

Chronology
 January 1972: Introduction of the Renault 5 in L and TL forms. Both models (which were available as three-door hatchbacks) had folding rear seats, grey bumpers, wind-up front windows, and dashboard-mounted gear shift levers. The TL was better equipped and had a vanity mirror for the front seat passenger, three ashtrays (one under the gear shift and two in the rear), two separate reclining front seats instead of one bench seat, front pull handles, and three storage pockets as well as a heated rear window.
 September 1972: The Renault 5 was launched on the British market in right-hand drive form.
 1973: Gear lever moved from dashboard to floor, between the front seats. 
 April 1974: Introduction of the R5 LS, same as the R5 TL but with a larger 1.3 engine, different design steel wheels, H4 iodine headlights, electric windscreen washers, fully carpeted floor ahead of the front seats, carpeted rear parcel shelf, electronic rev counter, daily totalizer, two-speed ventilation system, rear wiper, and an illuminated ashtray with cigarette lighter.
 September 1974: R5 LS renamed R5 TS. The TS had all features of the previous LS, plus new front seats with integrated head restraints, black bumpers, illuminated heater panel, front spoiler, clock, opening rear quarter lights and reversing lights.
 February 1976: Introduction of the R5 Alpine, with 1397 cc engine with hemispherical combustion chambers, high compression ratio, and special five-speed manual gearbox. The R5 GTL was also launched in 1976 with the 1289 cc engine from the R5 TS (with the power reduced to 42 bhp), the equipment specification of the R5 TL plus grey side protection strips, and some features from the R5 TS such as the styled wheels, reversing lights, cigarette lighter, illuminated heater panel, and electric windscreen washers.
 1977: The R5 GTL got opening rear quarter lights and the R5 L got the new 845 cc engine.
 January 1978: Introduction of the R5 automatic, essentially a GTL with a three-speed automatic transmission and some features from the TS.
 August 1979: Five-door model presented
 1980: Five-door TL, GTL, and automatic models arrive
 1982: Introduction of the R5 TX and the hot hatch R5 Alpine Turbo, a replacement for the R5 Alpine with a Garrett T3 turbo, new alloy wheels, stiffer suspension, and disc brakes on all four wheels.
 1984: The R5 is replaced by an all-new second-generation model.

Engines
 B1B 0.8 L 8-valve I4; ; top speed: ; 0–100 km/h (62 mph): 22.3 s

 C1E (688) 1.1 L 8-valve I4; ; top speed: ; 0–100 km/h (62 mph): 21.4 s
 810 1.3 L 8-valve I4; ; top speed:  (automatic)
 810 1.3 L 8-valve I4; ; top speed: ; 0–100 km/h (62 mph): 15.6 s
 C1J (847) 1.4 L 8-valve I4; ; top speed: ; 0–100 km/h (62 mph): 21.4 s (automatic)
 C6J 1.4 L turbo 8-valve I4; ; top speed: ; 0–100 km/h (62 mph): 9.1 s
 C1J 1.4 L (1,397 cc or 85.3 cu in) turbo 8-valve I4; 160 PS (118 kW; 158 hp); top speed: 204 km/h (127 mph); 0-100 km/h (62 mph): 6.9 s

Motorsport

The Renault 5 Alpine version was raced in Group 2. In the 1978 Monte Carlo, Renault 5 Alpines came second and third overall, despite a powerful team entry from Fiat and Lancia.

In 1978, a rally Group 4 (later Group B) version was introduced. It was named the Renault 5 Turbo, but being mid-engined and rear-wheel drive, this car had little technical resemblance to the road-going version. Though retaining the shape and general look of the 5, only the door panels were shared with the standard version. Driven by Jean Ragnotti, this car won the 1981 Monte Carlo Rally for its first race. The 2WD R5 turbo soon faced competition from new 4WD cars that were faster on dirt; however, the Renault remained among the fastest of its era on paved roads.

Production elsewhere
Iran
The original Renault 5 continued to be produced in Iran by SAIPA, then by Pars Khodro (a SAIPA subsidiary), as the Sepand. In 2001 the Renault PK went on sale: for this version, the Sepand's Renault 5 platform was replaced with that of a Kia Pride, while a modified version of the Renault 5's bodywork was kept. The Sepand II, restyled in 2000, was kept in production with the original Renault underpinnings for a little while longer as a lower-cost alternative.

South Africa
Assembly in South Africa began in late 1975, in Durban. The car was built in Toyota's local plant and sold through their network. The Renault 5 was only available with one engine, the 1.3 L unit used in the European R5 TS rated at  SAE. There was a base model, with vinyl seats and lap belts only, and the upmarket LS and LSS models. These received fabric interiors, side stripes, a vinyl roof, and more sound deadening and other comfort details. The LSS also got a central console and a full-length fabric sunroof. Many extras used in Europe, such as a rear window wiper and a tachometer, were not available in South Africa because it would make it impossible to meet local content regulations. Local content was 56% at introduction; this was to be increased steadily as production wore on.

By 1979, the lineup was restricted to the GTL and the TS, both still with the 1289 cc engine but now with  ISO respectively.

Yugoslavia
IMV from Novo Mesto, SR Slovenia, built several Renault models since 1972, including the Renault 5 for the Yugoslav market.

Second generation (1984–1996)

The second generation R5, marketed as the Renault 5 (or "Superfive"), launched in October 1984 — within 18 months of Ford, General Motors, Peugeot, Fiat and Nissan launching competitors in the supermini sector. It was initially only available with a three-door body, which led to a somewhat slow introduction. Right-hand drive models for the UK market were launched in January 1985.

The bodyshell and platform were completely new (the platform was based on that of the larger Renault 9 and 11), and R5 aesthetic remained; styling was by Marcello Gandini. The biggest changes were the adoption of a transversely-mounted powertrain from the 9 and 11 and MacPherson strut front suspension. The five-door version arrived in May 1985.

The second generation launched in four trim levels: TC, TL, GTL, and Automatic. The TC and TL had four-speed manual gearboxes, while the GTL, TS, and TSE had five-speed manual gearboxes (which were optional on the TL), and the Automatic had a three-speed automatic gearbox. 1987 saw the introduction of the 1721 cc F2N engine in the GTX, GTE (F3N), and Baccara (Monaco in some markets, notably the United Kingdom). Diesel versions arrived in November 1985, mostly completing the range.

It was planned to market the vehicle as a downsized successor, substituting the AMC Pacer in the USA, which affected the design of the R5. Within the alliance of Renault and the American Motors Corporation, only its predecessor was marketed in the USA.

Renault used the naturally aspirated 1.7 L from the Renault 9/11, with multipoint fuel injection, in addition to the sports-orientated 1.4 L turbo. Under the name GTE, it produced  with a catalytic converter. Although not as fast as the turbo model, it featured the same interior and exterior sports appearance, as well as identical suspension and brakes. The Baccara and GTX versions used the 1.7 engine - with the GTX featuring a full leather interior, power steering, electric windows, sunroof, high-specification audio equipment, with available air-conditioning and an onboard computer. The latter was effectively the same but the leather interior was an option and there were other detail changes. As with the previous generation, the 5 Turbo was again assembled at the Alpine plant in Dieppe, where forty cars per day were constructed in 1985.

In 1990, the R5 was effectively replaced by the Clio, which was a sales success across Europe. Production of the R5 was transferred to the Revoz factory in Yugoslavia (since 1992, Slovenia) when the Clio was launched. It remained on sale with only 1.1 L, 1.4 L petrol, and 1.6 L naturally aspirated diesel engines.

The GT Turbo, with its turbocharged 1.4 engine and a top speed of more than 120 mph, was discontinued in 1991 on the launch of the Clio 16-valve.

A new 1.4 L engine with a catalytic converter engine used in the Clio was introduced during December 1992, which also marked the end of the R5 Diesel (retail market commercial fleet models kept this option). The most common variant available after the Clio had been introduced as a minimally equipped model named the R5 Campus until the car's 12-year production ended in 1996. It also marked the end of the R5 designation after nearly 25 years and the discontinuation of numerical model designations for Renault cars that had been in use for much of the company's history.

The Campus sold more strongly in the United Kingdom than elsewhere, because the Renault Twingo (which addressed the same market) was only sold in LHD form and only in mainland Europe. In 2011, it was recommended as one of "Britain's best bangers", by Car Mechanics Magazine because of the number of inexpensive, low mileage, full-service history, used cars on the market. The Campus name was revived in 2005 with the Renault Clio II.

Renault 5 GT Turbo
A "hot hatch" version, the GT Turbo, was introduced in February 1985. It used a modified four-cylinder, eight-valve Cléon 1397 cc engine, a pushrod unit dating back to the 1962 original (in 1108 cc form). It was turbocharged with an air-cooled Garrett T2 turbocharger.

To differentiate it from the standard 5, it came with plastic side skirts. Turbo lag was an issue, along with poor hot starting, and was considered rather difficult to control. The same engine was used in the Renault 9 and 11 Turbos. The regular  fuel tank was considered too small for the Turbo and a  supplementary tank was installed at the rear left of the car, and the 5 GT Turbo also received an oil cooler. The car's steering, at 3  turns from lock to lock, was also faster than the regular cars. Disc brakes on all four wheels with ventilated rotors on the front. The aerodynamic 5.5-inch wide aluminium wheels were similar to those of the Renault Alpine V6 GT.

In 1987, the facelifted Phase II was launched. Major changes in the Phase II version included installing watercooling to the turbocharger, aiding the Phase I's oil-cooled setup, which extended the life of the turbo. It also received a new ignition system which permitted it to rev 500 rpm higher. Externally, the car was revamped, with changes (including new bumpers and arches) that reduced the car's drag coefficient from 0.36 to 0.35. Giving Phase II a 0–100 km/h time of 7.5 seconds. In 1989 the GT Turbo received a new interior, and in 1990 the special edition Raider model (available only in metallic blue, with different interior and wheels) was launched. In late 1991 the Renault 5 GT Turbo was discontinued, superseded by the Clio 16V and the Clio Williams.

The Renault 5 GT Turbo's victory in the 1989 Rallye Côte d'Ivoire remains the only overall WRC victory for a Group N car.

WRC victories

Roger Saunders and Alex Postan both took part in the 1987 British Touring Car Championship season using a 5 GT Turbo.

Engines

Renault Express

The second-generation R5 also spawned a panel van version, known as the Renault Express. It was commercialized in some European countries as the Renault Extra (the UK and Ireland) or Renault Rapid (mainly German speaking countries). This car was intended to replace the R4 F6 panel van, production of which had ceased in 1986.

EBS convertible

In 1989, the Belgian company EBS produced convertible versions of the Renault 5 (1,400 in total), almost all of which were left-hand drive. A total of 14 of the 1,400 cars produced were based on the right-hand drive GT Turbo Phase II.

Revival

The Renault 5 nameplate is to return as an electric-powered hatchback bearing design cues inspired by the original design and the Renault 5 Turbo. An Alpine version is said to be in development as well.

Production
Overall production of the Renault 5 and all its variants: 9,017,276 units, comprising:
 Renault 5 French (1972-1985): 5,276,630
 Iranian R5 (1987-1992): 49,270
 R5 Turbo (1980-1986): 4987
 R5 Maxi (1985-1986): 154
 R5 society (1975-1984): 218,795
 Siete (Spanish R5 4-door) (1974-1982): 30,790 (some sites show production between 159,000 and 160,000)
 Supercinq (1984-1996) 3,436,650

References

External links

 "Road Test - Renault 5 GT Turbo" Autocar (UK) magazine, 26 March 1986
 Renault 5 details 
 First-generation Renault 5s
 RenaultSportClub - Anything from R5 Alpine to R.S. Clio 220T Trophy

1980s cars
1990s cars
Front-wheel-drive vehicles
Hot hatches
5
Subcompact cars
Cars introduced in 1972
Cars discontinued in 1996 
Touring cars